WWFD (820 AM HD Radio) is a commercial AM radio station licensed to serve Frederick, Maryland. The station is owned by Hubbard Broadcasting through licensee Washington DC FCC License Sub, LLC and simulcasts the freeform programming branded as The Gamut originating on the HD3 subchannel of sister station WTOP-FM. The Gamut programming is also available on the HD3 subchannels of sister stations WTLP and WWWT-FM, as well as on FM translator W232DG (94.3, Frederick).

WWFD also carries Washington Capitals, Washington Nationals, and Navy Midshipmen sports programming originating on sister station WFED. Sunday syndicated programming on The Gamut includes Music and the Spoken Word (with WFED), Anything Anything with Rich Russo and Little Steven's Underground Garage.

WWFD was the first licensed radio station in the United States to discontinue its traditional analog signal and operate solely in digital HD Radio, which it began under experimental authorization from the Federal Communications Commission (FCC) in 2018. WWFD's experiments with digital-only operation led to the FCC authorizing it on a voluntary basis for AM stations nationwide in 2020.

History
This station signed on in May 1961 as daytimer WMHI on 1370 AM. From 1975 through 1988, WZYQ was contemporary hit radio (CHR) station "Z104", with a brand emphasizing its simulcast on WZYQ-FM (103.9 FM). The station received permission to add nighttime operation and move to 820 AM in 1986. Two years later, 820 AM split from the simulcast, becoming country "The Big Q" WQSI with Frederick Keys baseball. 103.9 FM dropped the "-FM" suffix from its callsign (becoming WZYQ) and continued with CHR. Both stations were purchased by Liberty Broadcasting, the ownership of oldies WXTR (104.1 FM, Waldorf, Maryland), in 1995. Liberty's interest was in pairing WZYQ with WXTR, as WXTR's signal did not cover the northwestern Washington metropolitan area. All three stations were sold to Bonneville International the following year, who revived the "Z104" brand on the FM pair and built a successful CHR outlet focused on the Washington market. 103.9 FM is now WTLP, a simulcast partner for WTOP-FM.

Although the callsign WXTR moved over from 104.1 FM, Bonneville continued with country music on 820 AM. As with 103.9 FM, starting in 2000 Bonneville used 820 AM to bolster the coverage of one of their Washington-market stations to the northwest. Local programming ended on WXTR when it began simulcasting WTOP on December 18. The WTOP callsign was "parked" on the station when it was moved off of its historical home at 1500 AM on January 11, 2006. On March 30, 2006, the station joined Washington Post Radio, continuing with its successor Talk Radio 3WT (under the callsigns WTWT and WWWB, respectively) until the network was shut down on September 15, 2008. The station then became a simulcast of Federal News Radio, taking the current callsign WWFD to match. Bonneville sold its entire Washington cluster to Hubbard Broadcasting in 2011.

The Gamut began as an eclectic hobby Internet radio station run by WTOP-FM engineer Dave Kolesar. WTOP management took an interest in the project, and after retooling the music and coming up with the name The Gamut, it began broadcasting on the HD3 subchannel of WTOP-FM on December 5, 2011. WWFD was the first analog home of the format, beginning its simulcast on March 20, 2013. The Gamut later added a translator on 104.3 (W282BA) in Leesburg, Virginia that was previously used to repeat the main signal of WTOP-FM. This translator was given a power boost, becoming W283CD at 104.5, and relocated to Sterling in 2015. In February 2016, independently owned translator W252DC signed on from Great Falls, Virginia on 98.3.

W283CD has since been reassigned to WBQH, which temporarily left W252DC as the sole analog FM signal. W252DC moved to Arlington, Virginia, then Reston, Virginia to cover the city of Washington. This translator relayed The Gamut via a simulcast of WTOP-FM-HD3, until it switched to a simulcast of WHUR-FM-HD2 (96.3, Washington, D.C.) in March 2021. Hubbard signed on FM translator W232DG in Frederick on July 11, 2017. The translator was moved under the FCC's AM revitalization rules and must rebroadcast the 820 AM signal, including when it joins WFED for sports coverage.

On June 30, 2018, Hubbard applied for experimental authorization to convert to all-digital HD Radio broadcasts for one year. Although WWFD was by far The Gamut's largest analog signal, Kolesar stated that he felt growing The Gamut's audience through analog AM was not viable. Previous experimental all-digital signals had a larger listenable coverage area than analog or an in-band on-channel hybrid digital signal, although this is the first long-term experiment. The station continues to feed W232DG to preserve analog coverage to Frederick, its city of license. WWFD shut off its analog signal at noon on July 16.

Hubbard and Xperi, the current developer of HD Radio, have used WWFD to test new features and operating modes; it notably experimented with a multiplexed signal, the first of its kind for an AM station in North America, in December 2019. The FCC subsequently approved voluntary all-digital AM operation nationwide on October 27, 2020. The FCC has re-authorized WWFD for all-digital operation on an experimental basis through August 4, 2023. Hubbard expects that this will be the final extension request for experimental operations and is needed to address several unresolved issues, including all-digital multicasting.

Translators

The Gamut programming is also broadcast on the HD3 subchannels of sister stations WTOP-FM, WWWT, and WTLP.

References

External links

WFD
Hubbard Broadcasting
Frederick County, Maryland
Freeform radio stations
Radio stations established in 1960
1960 establishments in Maryland